Mae Sariang Subdistrict is a sub-district (tambon) of Mae Sariang District, in Mae Hong Son Province, Thailand. In 2005 it had a population of 9,968 people. The tambon contains nine villages.

Parts of sub-district Mae Sariang and of neighboring Ban Kat Sub-district form the Mae Sariang Sub-district Municipality.

Geography
Mae Sariang lies in the valley of the Yuam River, which runs through the town from north to south.

Climate
Mae Sariang has a tropical savanna climate (Köppen climate classification Aw). Winters are dry and warm. The monsoon season runs from May through October, with heavy rain and somewhat cooler temperatures during the day, although nights remain warm.

Transport 
Mae Sariang is connected to the rest of Thailand by two main roads: Route 108, which enters Mae Sariang from the east (from Chiang Mai) and exits to the north (to Mae Hong Son); and Route 105, which leads south out of the town through Mae Sot to Mueang Tak.

Mae Sariang is served by Mae Sariang Airport.

References

External links

Tambon of Mae Hong Son province
Populated places in Mae Hong Son province